Märt Sults (born 24 March 1961 in Valga) is an Estonian politician. He has been member of XIII Riigikogu.

In 1984 he graduated from University of Tartu in inorganic chemistry/teacher, and in 1989 in school psychology.

From 1995 to 2015 he was the director of Tallinn Art Gymnasium and is the current director of the Tartu Art School.

Since 2003 he is a member of Estonian Centre Party.

References

Living people
1961 births
People from Valga, Estonia
Estonian Centre Party politicians
Members of the Riigikogu, 2015–2019
University of Tartu alumni